Dichomeris pseudodeltaspis is a moth in the family Gelechiidae. It was described by Ponomarenko and Ueda in 2004. It is found in Thailand.

The forewings are greyish brown, with scattered dark brown scales forming small dots along the middle of the wing, the dorsal margin and termen. There is a large triangular costal mark before the middle, five small oblique marks before the latter and three to four beyond the large mark, as well as smaller spot. The hindwings are greyish brown, darker towards the apex.

Etymology
The species name is derived from Greek pseud (meaning false) and the name of the similar species Dichomeris deltaspis.

References

Moths described in 2004
pseudodeltaspis